The 2001–02 Regionalliga season was the eighth season of the Regionalliga at tier three of the German football league system.

The Regionalliga was split into two divisions, the Regionalliga Nord and the Regionalliga Süd. The champions of each, VfB Lübeck and SV Wacker Burghausen, were promoted to the 2002–03 2. Bundesliga, along with the runners-up Eintracht Braunschweig and SV Eintracht Trier.

Regionalliga Nord 
VfB Lübeck won the Nord division and was promoted to the 2. Bundesliga along with runners-up Eintracht Braunschweig. Fortuna Düsseldorf, Fortuna Köln and 1. FC Magdeburg were relegated to the Oberliga.

Standings

Results

Top scorers

Regionalliga Süd 
Wacker Burghausen won the Regionalliga Süd and was promoted to 2. Bundesliga along with runners-up Eintracht Trier.VfB Stuttgart Amateure, SpVgg Ansbach, Borussia Fulda and VfR Mannheim were relegated to the Oberliga.

Standings

Results

Top scorers

References

External links 
 Regionalliga at the German Football Association 
 Regionalliga Nord 2001–02 at kicker.de
 Regionalliga Süd 2001–02 at kicker.de

Regionalliga seasons
3
Germ